Immensen-Arpke is a railway station located between Arpke and Immensen, in the municipality of Lehrte in the German state of Lower Saxony. The station opened on 15 August 1893 and is located on the Berlin-Lehrte Railway. The train services are operated by Metronom.

During the first years it was used for freight trains until in the beginning 20th century it was also opened for passengers. The station building was sold and is private property.

Train services
The station is serves by the following service(s):

Regional services  Hannover - Lehrte - Gifhorn - Wolfsburg

References

Railway stations in Lower Saxony